Paralligator is an extinct genus of neosuchian crocodylomorph that lived during the Late Cretaceous (Cenomanian-Maastrichtian) period in what is now the Bayan Shireh and Nemegt formations of Mongolia, approximately 96 million to 70 million years ago.

Taxonomy

Three species are recognized:

Misassigned species
"Paralligator" sungaricus, described from the Early Cretaceous Nenjiang Formation of Jilin Province, China, is based on postcranial remains consisting of a few presacral vertebrae, dorsal osteoderms, a partial left femur, and the proximal part of a left tibia and fibula. However, the type material is too fragmentary to be considered diagnostic, and the species is a nomen dubium.

References

Late Cretaceous crocodylomorphs of Asia
Fossil taxa described in 1954
Prehistoric pseudosuchian genera